Parrot SA is a French wireless products manufacturer company based in Paris, France. It was founded in 1994 by Christine/M De Tourvel, Jean-Pierre Talvard and Henri Seydoux. 

Since 2017, it has focused exclusively on drone manufacturing.

The company 
The firm specializes in technologies involving voice recognition and signal processing for embedded products and remotely controlled flying machines (also known as drones). It also develops products related to car telephony: Parrot chipsets (including DSP), copyrighted noise reduction and echo cancelling algorithms, Bluetooth software stack, end-user applications (Bluetooth hands free car kits). The products are sold to consumers through retailers, and are also incorporated into vehicles with the factory-installed audio system. 

Parrot's Bluetooth hands free technology can also be found in first mount.

Its stock symbol on the Paris stock exchange is PARRO and the company is currently a member of the CAC Small 90. On NASDAQ it is known as PAOTF.

Parrot is listed on the Eurolist by Euronext (Compartment B) Paris stock market since 2006 under the symbol PARRO, Code ISIN FR0004038263.

In 1995 Parrot introduced Voicemate, a personal digital assistant with voice recognition. It was used by many visually impaired people, including Stevie Wonder.

In 2000 Parrot launched the first Bluetooth hands-free car kit in partnership with Ericsson.

In 2006, still developing the use of Bluetooth, the company also produced home products like digital photo frames and high fidelity wireless speakers.

In 2008, Parrot launched a Design By collection, featuring designers like Andrée Putman, Martin Szekely and Philippe Starck.

In January 2010, Parrot introduced at CES Las Vegas the Parrot AR.Drone flying hardware piloted over Wi-Fi with a smartphone and Open API game development platform, ARdrone.org.

In 2012 Parrot bought 57% of Swiss drone company SenseFly as well as 25% of the Swiss photogrammetry company Pix4D. Both companies are spin-offs from EPFL.

In 2014 Parrot introduced the mini-drones Rolling Spider and Jumping Sumo at CES Las Vegas. Parrot increased its ownership in Pix4D to 57%.  In May 2014 at the annual AUVSI conference in Orlando, Parrot announced the AR Drone 3.0, code-named Bebop, permitting YouTube personality Kyle Tarpley from the YouTube channel "AR Drone Show w/ Kyle Tarpley" to live-stream video the day before the conference opened.  Parrot also revealed the option for a Skycontroller, when purchasing the Bebop. The Skycontroller allows the Bebop Drone to fly up to 2 kilometers. The Parrot Bebop Drone is scheduled for a December 2014 release and it comes in blue, red, and yellow.

In 2014 Mr Shahzad Ahmed bought shares In AR.Further, it will expanded as product in Pakistan. (Source ?)

At the January 2015 CES Las Vegas, Parrot unveiled the Parrot POT, a self-watering system for plants and Parrot Zik Sport.

In 2015, Parrot SA created two subsidiaries: Parrot Drones and Parrot Automotive.

In San Francisco in November 2015, Parrot introduced the Bebop 2 drone.

Parrot purchased shares in 2015 in startups specialized in the drones industry: Airinov, EOS Innovation, Micasense and Iconem.

In 2016, Parrot SA released the Disco FPV, the world's first smart flying fixed-winged drone.

In January 2017, Parrot announced firing 290 of its 840 employees due to poor sales. The company then abandons its wireless and connected home devices to focus exclusively on drone manufacturing.

On 1 July 2018, Parrot released the Parrot Anafi folding drone with 4K HDR and 21 megapixel camera.

In May 2019, Parrot has been selected by U.S. military to win the contract for making reconnaissance drone and received $11 million from Department of Defense.

In January 2021, Parrot sealed a deal with French army for 300 micro-drones.

Other Parrot products 
Audio
Parrot Zik (version:1.0;2.0;3): wireless and tactile headphones, dubbed "the world's most advanced headphones"

Connected Garden
 Parrot Flower Power
 Parrot POT: self-watering pot with sensors and water tank
 Parrot H2O: A plant sensor that can give you up to three weeks of autonomous irrigation

Drones
Parrot Anafi USA
Parrot Anafi Thermal
Parrot Anafi
Parrot Anafi FPV. Smaller than Parrot Anafi and with FPV goggles included.
Parrot AR.Drone: "Bebop" A lightweight electric quadcopter.
Parrot AR Drone 2.0: A smartphone controlled electric quadcopter
 Parrot Bebop Drone
 Parrot Bebop 2
 Parrot Skycontroller - long range remote controller
 Parrot Disco FPV - smart fixed-winged flying wing

Minidrones
 Parrot Rolling spider quadcopter
 Parrot Jumping Sumo robot
 Parrot Hydrofoil hybrid toy

Automotive
Parrot RNB 6: An Android 2-DIN Infotainment Navigation System running on Android V5.0 Lollipop
 Parrot ASTEROID 1-DIN, Tablet and SMART
 Parrot MINIKIT speakerphone
 Parrot Driveblue
 Parrot MKi 9000, 9100, 9200
 Parrot CK3100: Bluetooth car kit with LCD screen
 Parrot CK3000

Speakerphones
 Parrot Conference: conferencing unit (launched in 2005)

PDA
 Parrot Voice Mate: personal digital assistant for blind and impaired people (launched in 1996)

References

Manufacturing companies established in 1994
Electronics companies of France
Manufacturing companies based in Paris
Unmanned aerial vehicle manufacturers
French brands
Companies listed on Euronext Paris
1994 establishments in France
French companies established in 1994
Publicly traded companies